George Atlee Goodling (September 26, 1896 – October 17, 1982) was a Republican member of the U.S. House of Representatives from Pennsylvania.

Biography
George Atlee Goodling was born in Loganville, Pennsylvania. During the First World War he served as a seaman, second class in the United States Navy from March 1918 to December 1918. He received a B.S. from the Pennsylvania State University in 1921.

After graduation he was the operator of a fruit farm near Loganville, the director of a bank, motor club, and insurance company. Goodling served on the local school board. He served in the Pennsylvania House of Representatives from 1943 to 1957.

He was elected to Congress as a Republican in 1960, defeating incumbent Democratic Congressman James M. Quigley and served two terms. He was an unsuccessful candidate for reelection in 1964 but was elected in 1966 for the first of four more terms ending in 1975 when he was succeeded by his son William F. Goodling.

References

 Retrieved on 2008-01-24
The Political Graveyard

1896 births
1982 deaths
United States Navy personnel of World War I
Military personnel from Pennsylvania
School board members in Pennsylvania
Businesspeople from Pennsylvania
Farmers from Pennsylvania
Republican Party members of the Pennsylvania House of Representatives
Pennsylvania State University alumni
People from York County, Pennsylvania
Republican Party members of the United States House of Representatives from Pennsylvania
20th-century American politicians
20th-century American businesspeople
United States Navy sailors